Line S 7 is an S-Bahn line on the Rhine-Ruhr network in the German state of North Rhine-Westphalia, which has been operated by VIAS GmbH from Wuppertal Hauptbahnhof to Solingen Hauptbahnhof since 15 December 2013. It is operated at 20-minute intervals, using LINT 41 vehicles. The service was previously classified as Regionalbahn service RB 47, known as the Der Müngstener, a reference to the Müngsten Bridge, which it crosses and DB Regio had operated it on the same route with class 628 diesel multiple units since 1994. It was also operated at 20-minute intervals, in the evenings and on weekends, every 30 minutes.

Line S 7 runs over lines built by two railway companies:
 from Wuppertal Hauptbahnhof to Wuppertal-Oberbarmen station over the Elberfeld–Dortmund railway, opened by the Bergisch-Märkische Railway Company in 1847 and 1849,
 from Wuppertal-Oberbarmen to Solingen Hauptbahnhof over the Wuppertal-Oberbarmen–Solingen railway, opened in sections by the Bergisch-Märkische Railway Company between 1867 and 1872 and by the Prussian state railways between 1893 and 1897.

There was an earlier line S 7 operated by DB Regio, which began at Düsseldorf Airport Terminal station. From there it ran south to Solingen Hbf via Düsseldorf Hbf. With the change to the 2010 timetable on 13 December 2009, line S1 replaced the service between Düsseldorf Hbf and Solingen.  The S11 was extended to run to Düsseldorf Airport Terminal station.

Notes

 
S07
2013 establishments in Germany